The Public Policy graduate program at the University of Maryland, Baltimore County was created in 1974 under Chancellor Calvin B. T. Lee. Now known as the School of Public Policy, the program offers the master of public policy and PhD. degrees, and has an enrollment of over 130 students.

History

Six years after the university's establishment, the Policy Sciences Graduate Program was organized as part of the graduate school and began enrollment two years later. The program became the Department of Public Policy in 2003. The following year, the department moved into the newly constructed Public Policy building. In 2014, the department became the School of Public Policy.

Programs

 Master of Public Policy
 Doctor of Philosophy
 Dual degrees in law and public policy with the University of Maryland School of Law, and the University of Baltimore School of Law
 Dual degree MPP/MD with the University of Maryland School of Medicine
 Articulated agreement for MPA/Ph.D. with the University of Baltimore
 Articulated MA/Ph.D. with the Economic Policy Analysis (ECPA) in the Department of Economics, UMBC

Faculty 
https://publicpolicy.umbc.edu/faculty/

Specializations 

 Economics (Ph.D. only)
 Education Policy
 Emergency Services (Ph.D. only)
 Environmental Policy (MPP only)
 Evaluation and Analytical Methods
 Health Policy
 Policy History (Ph.D. only)
 Public Management
 Urban Policy

References

School of Public Policy
Public policy schools
Public administration schools in the United States
Public Policy
Educational institutions established in 2014
2014 establishments in Maryland